Doña Dolores Elizabeth "Lola" Chávez de Armijo (born at Albuquerque, New Mexico in 1858, died at Santa Fe, New Mexico in 1929) was the State Librarian of New Mexico. In 1912 William C. McDonald the governor of New Mexico claimed that women were unqualified to hold office under the constitution and laws of New Mexico, and tried to replace Dolores by using a court order. He wanted to replace her with a male friend to whom he owed a political favor. In response, Dolores filed a lawsuit with the New Mexico Supreme Court (State v. De Armijo 1914-NMSC-021); the court ruled in her favor, allowing her to keep her position, and subsequent legislation gave women the right to hold appointed offices in New Mexico. Dolores was the first woman and first Hispanic woman to serve in a statewide capacity in New Mexico.

Her father, José Francisco Chaves, was a Republican political leader in the New Mexico Territory.

References

External links

1858 births
1929 deaths
American librarians
American women librarians
American women's rights activists
Gender discrimination lawsuits
People from New Mexico
Hispanic and Latino American librarians